Quercus oglethorpensis (also called Oglethorpe oak) is a species of plant in the beech family. It is endemic to the United States. It is named for Oglethorpe County, Georgia, where it was first discovered. The county, in turn, is named for James Oglethorpe, the founder of Georgia Colony in the 18th century.

Description
The bark is white or pale gray.

Distribution
Quercus oglethorpensis is endemic to the southeastern United States, found only in the Piedmont of Georgia and South Carolina, and in Alabama, Louisiana and Mississippi.

Diseases
This species is commonly affected by chestnut blight.

References

External links
 
 

oglethorpensis
Endemic flora of the United States
Trees of the Southeastern United States
Plants described in 1940
Endangered flora of the United States
Taxonomy articles created by Polbot